Ciudad Bugambilias (Guadalajara, Mexico) Spanish pronunciation: [sjuˈðað βuɣãmˈbiljas] is an exclusive residential gated neighborhood, located in the municipality of Zapopan, part of the metropolitan zone of Guadalajara in the state of Jalisco, Mexico.

Established in 1975. It was one of the first neighborhoods developed towards the south of the city focusing on green communal areas, enclosed by the polygon forestal protected area Cerro del Tajo and part of the Primavera Forest.

It is known to be home to many high-net-worth individuals and affluent established families of the country.

Its main entrance is located via Avenida López Mateos.

The area is currently monitored by a new system of surveillance C5 introduced in partnership with the state and private police.

Geography 
Divided into two sections, the first located at the bottom of the forest plateau and the second on the hill directly next to the forest and overseeing the city. The second panoramic section has the best air quality compared to the rest of the city due to its proximity to the forest.

Green areas are currently protected restricting construction due to their ecological importance and biodiversity since 2018 by the INAH (National Institute of Archaeology and History), SEMARNAT (Secretariat of Environment and Natural Resources), SCT (Secretaríat de Communications and Transport), and government of the state of Jalisco.

Education

Private schools include 

 Cumbres International School Guadalajara (Legionaries of Christ)
 Instituto Alpes Bugambilias (Legionaries of Christ)
 Instituto DaVinci Talentos (Preschool)

Economy

Shopping malls 

 Plaza Bugambilias
 Plaza Panorámica Bugambilias

Private Clubs 

 Bugambilias Club

See also 

 Zapopan 
 Guadalajara 
 Guadalajara Metropolitan Area

References 

Zapopan
Luxury real estate
Architecture in Mexico
Edge cities in Mexico
Guadalajara metropolitan area
Guadalajara, Jalisco
Gated communities